The Mongol National Organisation is a political party in Nepal. In contrast to different Mulbaasi movements, MNO emphasizes racial identity rather than ethnicity. MNO rejects the term 'janajati'.

The party was denied registration in 1990. Albeit unregistered, the party launched independent candidates in the 1991, 1994 and 1999 parliamentary elections in Ilam and Jhapa Districts. None were elected. The party was registered with the Election Commission of Nepal ahead of the 2008 Constituent Assembly election. In the 2008 CA polls, the party got 11,578 votes (0.11%) in the proportional representation vote.

Whilst unsuccessful in national elections, the party, as of 2007, had won village level seats in Ilam District
This party is focused to establish caste discrimination in Nepal.

References

Political parties in Nepal
Political parties of minorities in Nepal
1989 establishments in Nepal